In Greek mythology, Amphissa (Ancient Greek: Ἄμφισσα) may refer to the following personages:

 Amphissa, daughter of Macareus.
 Amphissa, an alternate name for Metope, the daughter of King Echetus and lover of Aechmodicus.

Notes

Reference 

 Publius Ovidius Naso, The Epistles of Ovid. London. J. Nunn, Great-Queen-Street; R. Priestly, 143, High-Holborn; R. Lea, Greek-Street, Soho; and J. Rodwell, New-Bond-Street. 1813. Online version at the Perseus Digital Library.

Women in Greek mythology
Characters in Greek mythology